The leanXcam is an open source based smart camera that is used for industrial applications in the field of machine vision. The hardware design is available for free. It can be downloaded free of charge, making it possible to make the board oneself.

In a presentation at the Vision 2008 exhibition in Stuttgart, leanXcam met with a great positive resonance in the media.

Application
The leanXcam is used by various universities, government agencies, industrial companies and private clients worldwide. The open source philosophy is encountered, especially in the universities, with great interest. Each also has its own library files freely available on the Internet.

Of the known applications of the leanXcam, it is used to automate production processes, quality controls, and to operate autonomously. In security, the camera is used to recognize objects within the viewing window, and if necessary to trigger an alarm. The leanXcam can also be used as a simple webcam for motion pictures on the Internet.

Hardware
The smart camera contains a Blackfin DSP processor (ADSP-BF537), which can analyze the image data directly and evaluate. The camera sensor provides 60 images per second with a resolution of 752 x 480 pixels. This combination allows operation without an external computer. Communication is made available through the Ethernet port on the camera or, for small amounts of data, via RS-232 and I2C.

Software
The freely available operating system uClinux is used. This allows the use of various standard programs, such as web servers, directly on the camera. An open source software library (Oscar) allows the control of hardware through the appropriate drivers. Several sample applications in C and C++ are available on the Internet and can be used as a basis for implementing one's own projects.

Technical data

Interface
 Ethernet 100 Mbit/s using a 8P8C (RJ45) connector
 RS-232
 I²C
 Micro-SD card
 5V DC Power supply

Dimensions
 (L x W x H)

Community
The open source project is kept alive by a large community that is supported by the development portal of ETH Zurich. Under https://github.com/scs/leanXcam/wiki the resources for the developments and enhancements of the software package can be found. Numerous examples of software, documentation, and libraries are freely available online.

Awards
2008 marked the most important exhibition for industrial image processing (VISION) of the leanXcam with the "Vision Award 2008".

References

External links
 Official website

Webcams